SC Dynamo Slovyansk was a Ukrainian football club from Sloviansk.

League and cup history

{|class="wikitable"
|-bgcolor="#efefef"
! Season
! Div.
! Pos.
! Pl.
! W
! D
! L
! GS
! GA
! P
!Domestic Cup
!colspan=2|Europe
!Notes
|}

See also
 FC Slavkhlib Slovyansk

References

Football clubs in Sloviansk
Dynamo Sloviansk
Association football clubs established in 1994
Association football clubs disestablished in 1996
1994 establishments in Ukraine
1996 disestablishments in Ukraine